Tomche Grozdanovski (Macedonian: Томче Гроздановски; born 14 March 2000) is a Macedonian professional footballer who plays for ViOn Zlaté Moravce and North Macedonia U21 as a midfielder.

Club career

FC ViOn Zlaté Moravce
Grozdanovski made his Fortuna Liga debut for ViOn Zlaté Moravce against AS Trenčín on 23 February  2019.

References

External links
 FC ViOn Zlaté Moravce official club profile 
 
 Futbalnet profile 
 

2000 births
Living people
Footballers from Skopje
Association football midfielders
Macedonian footballers
Macedonian expatriate footballers
North Macedonia youth international footballers
North Macedonia under-21 international footballers
FC ViOn Zlaté Moravce players
NK Dugopolje players
Slovak Super Liga players
First Football League (Croatia) players
Expatriate footballers in Slovakia
Macedonian expatriate sportspeople in Slovakia
Expatriate footballers in Croatia
Macedonian expatriate sportspeople in Croatia